Space Combat is a game produced by Laminar Research to provide a simulation of space combat with accurate physics, unlike most other games of the same genre. Although originally a shareware game, the latest version of Space Combat—1.40—was released as freeware.

In the game, the laws of physics are modeled fully, so ships do not behave like aircraft: they behave like spaceships in a frictionless vacuum. This means that any velocity picked up will be maintained unless an opposite force is applied by the engines.

The game is a free-form simulation, with no plot or mission system. The spaceships have things such as biodomes and customizable engines. The ships can be equipped with weapons (such as lasers and torpedoes).

External links
  (archived)

2004 video games
Freeware games
Linux games
MacOS games
Space flight simulator games
Video games developed in the United States
Windows games